Smits is a Dutch surname that is considered a variant of the more common Smit surname. The name is an old plural of Smid (blacksmith), though the plural in modern Dutch would be Smeden.

Frequency of occurrence in general populations 
Information for surname frequency in the Netherlands is limited by the end of comprehensive census taking in 1971.  The most recent readily available information is based on the 1947 census, for which both raw census data and surname frequency data have been made available to the general public.  In 1947 there were 15,151 recorded people with the surname Smits, while the general census provides a figure of 9,519,000 as the 1947 population.  Working with this data the frequency of the Smits surname in the Netherlands in 1947 can be calculated to be ~0.159% or ~1,590 of every 1,000,000 people, which is ½ the frequency of the surname Smit, of which Smits is a variant. In 2007 there were 23,205 carriers of this surname in The Netherlands and 3,888 in Belgium.

Notable people sharing the Smits surname 
 Alexander Smits (born 1948), Australian-American engineer
 Andreas Smits (1870–1948), Dutch physical chemist
 Anita Smits (born 1967), Dutch archer
 Bart Smits (born 1972), Dutch heavy metal singer
 Eva Smits (1906–1992), Dutch freestyle swimmer
 George Smits (1944–1997), Belgian inventor of experimental musical instruments
 Glenn Smits (born 1990), Dutch tennis player
 Gregory Smits (born 1960),  American historian and Japanologist
 Hans Smits (born 1956), Dutch water polo player
 Hendrik Smits (1907–1976), Dutch rower
 Inger Smits (born 1994), Dutch handball player
 Jakob Smits (1855–1928), Dutch painter 
 Jan M. Smits (born 1967), Dutch law professor
 Jean Baptiste Smits 1792–1857), Belgian politician
 Jeroen Smits (born 1972), Dutch cricketer
 Jimmy Smits (born 1955), American actor
 John Smits (born 1988), Canadian soccer player
 Jorn Smits (born 1992), Dutch handball player
  (1901–1986), Dutch musicologist
 Joshua Smits (born 1992), Dutch footballer
 Louisa Smits (born 1940s), Belgian racing cyclist
 Ludowyk Smits (1635–1707),  Dutch painter
 Lukas Smits (born 1935), Dutch painter
 Manja Smits (born 1985), Dutch politician
 Marije Smits (born 1986), Dutch Paralympic sprinter
 Pepijn Smits (born 1996), Dutch swimmer
 Rik Smits (born 1966), Dutch basketball player
 Rik Smits (linguist) (born 1953), Dutch linguist, author, and journalist
 Robert-Jan Smits (born 1958), Dutch civil servant
 Seppe Smits (born 1991), Belgian snowboarder
 Simon Smits (born 1955), Dutch ambassador to the United Kingdom
 Sonja Smits (born 1955), Canadian actress
 Tim Smits (born 1986), Australian footballer
 Ton Smits (1921–1981), Dutch cartoonist
 Twan Smits (born 1985), Dutch footballer 
 William Smits (1704–1770), Dutch Franciscan orientalist and exegete
 Willie Smits (born 1957), Dutch conservationist
 Xenia Smits (born 1994), German handball player
 Yanis Smits or Jānis Šmits (born before 1940), Canadian Latvian Baptist bishop

See also
 Klaas Smits River, a river in South Africa

Notes

References

 
 
 
 
 

Dutch-language surnames
Occupational surnames